Myross Bush is a rural community on the northeastern outskirts of the city of Invercargill in the Southland region of New Zealand's South Island.  Other nearby settlements include Makarewa to the northwest, Rakahouka and Roslyn Bush to the northeast, and Kennington to the southeast.

Demographics

The statistical area had a population of 1,134 at the 2018 New Zealand census, an increase of 84 people (8.0%) since the 2013 census, and an increase of 171 people (17.8%) since the 2006 census. There were 384 households. There were 576 males and 561 females, giving a sex ratio of 1.03 males per female. The median age was 44.6 years (compared with 37.4 years nationally), with 243 people (21.4%) aged under 15 years, 156 (13.8%) aged 15 to 29, 588 (51.9%) aged 30 to 64, and 150 (13.2%) aged 65 or older.

Ethnicities were 96.3% European/Pākehā, 7.1% Māori, 0.8% Pacific peoples, 0.5% Asian, and 0.8% other ethnicities (totals add to more than 100% since people could identify with multiple ethnicities).

The proportion of people born overseas was 6.3%, compared with 27.1% nationally.

Although some people objected to giving their religion, 51.6% had no religion, 42.1% were Christian and 0.8% had other religions.

Of those at least 15 years old, 177 (19.9%) people had a bachelor or higher degree, and 144 (16.2%) people had no formal qualifications. The median income was $46,800, compared with $31,800 nationally. 267 people (30.0%) earned over $70,000 compared to 17.2% nationally. The employment status of those at least 15 was that 510 (57.2%) people were employed full-time, 162 (18.2%) were part-time, and 12 (1.3%) were unemployed.

Education
Myross Bush School is a contributing primary school serving years 1 to 6 with a roll of  students as of  The school opened in 1866 and moved to its current site in 1868.

References

Populated places in Southland, New Zealand
Invercargill